Liechtensteinische Post AG is the postal service of the Principality of Liechtenstein since 2000. Prior to that, postal service of the principality was managed by Swiss Post from 1 February 1921 until 31 December 1999 upon the signing of a postal treaty signed between the Swiss Confederation and Liechtenstein on 10 November 1920 as part of the customs union between the two states.

External links 
 Official site of the Liechtensteinische Post AG 

Communications in Liechtenstein
Companies of Liechtenstein
Liechtenstein
Liechtenstein–Switzerland relations
Postal system of Liechtenstein